Pilot Station is a city in Kusilvak Census Area, Alaska, United States. The population was 568 at the 2010 census, up from 550 in 2000.

Geography
Pilot Station is located at  (61.936050, -162.883403), on the northern bank of the lower Yukon River, approximately eighty miles ('as the crow flies') from the Bering Sea.

Demographics

Pilot Station first appeared on the 1890 U.S. Census as the unincorporated Inuit village of "Ankahchagmiut." It did not report again until 1920, then as Pilot Station. It formally incorporated in 1969.

At the 2000 census, there were 550 people, 109 households and 92 families residing in the city. The racial makeup was 96.91% Native American, 2.36% White and 0.73% from two or more races.

There were 109 households, of which 61.5% had children under the age of 18 living with them, 51.4% were married couples living together, 22.9% had a female householder with no husband present, and 14.7% were non-families. 11.0% of all households were made up of individuals, and 1.8% had someone living alone who was 65 years of age or older. The average household size was 5.05 and the average family size was 5.47.

48.0% of the population were under the age of 18, 9.5% from 18 to 24, 26.9% from 25 to 44, 10.4% from 45 to 64, and 5.3% who were 65 years of age or older.  The median age was 20 years. For every 100 females, there were 126.3 males. For every 100 females age 18 and over, there were 105.8 males.

The median household income was $31,071 and the median family income was $27,411. Males had a median income of $27,917 and females $16,667. The per capita income was $7,311. About 25.3% of families and 28.7% of the population were below the poverty line, including 26.0% of those under age 18 and 28.1% of those age 65 or over.

Education
K-12 students attend Pilot Station School, operated by the Lower Yukon School District.

References

Cities in Alaska
Cities in Kusilvak Census Area, Alaska
Yukon River